Captain is the first release by the Scottish rock band Idlewild, issued by Deceptive Records in 1998. Although the number of tracks would normally classify it as an EP, Captain is commonly known as a mini-album. The guitarist Rod Jones notes that the album "was a sort of introduction to Idlewild".

The album was produced by Paul Tipler in the first week of October 1997 at River Studios, London.

In an interview in 2007, Roddy Woomble spoke about the album, saying that he "was singing in an American accent, y’know! Of course it’s how we found our feet – I was deeply into Tom Barman, and even though he’s Belgian he sang in an American accent, and I thought if he could do it so could I. But after the first album, I found another voice, my own voice."

The album was played in full alongside Make Another World, on 21 December 2008.

Track listing 
All tracks written and composed by Idlewild.
 "Self Healer" - 1:58
 "Annihilate Now!" - 3:32
 "Captain" - 3:35
 "Last Night I Missed All the Fireworks" - 1:24
 "Satan Polaroid" - 3:17
 "You Just Have to Be Who You Are" - 5:57
 "Queen Of The Troubled Teens" - 2:15 (Japan bonus track)
 "Faster" - 1:51 (Japan bonus track)
 "Self Healer (1st Version)" - 2:24 (Japan bonus track)
 "House Alone" - 1:34 (Japan bonus track)

Personnel
 Bob Fairfoull - bass guitar
 Rod Jones - guitar
 Colin Newton - drums
 Roddy Woomble - vocals
 Paul "The Captain" Tipler - producer
 Ian Ritterskamp - photography

References

Idlewild (band) albums
1998 debut EPs